Alfred Simpson may refer to:

 Alfred Simpson (ironmaster) (1805–1891), English iron worker who emigrated to South Australia
 Alfred Allen Simpson (1875–1939), industrialist in South Australia
 Alfred Edward Simpson (1868–1940), architect in South Australia
 Alfred Henry Simpson (1914–2003), British lawyer and Chief Justice of Kenya
 Alfred M. Simpson (1843–1917), South Australian industrialist
 A. W. B. Simpson (Alfred William Brian Simpson, 1931–2011), British legal historian